The phrase pray and work (or 'pray and labor'; Latin: ora et labora) refers to the Catholic monastic practice of working and praying, generally associated with its use in the Rule of Saint Benedict.

History
"Ora et labora" (pray and work) is the traditional motto of the Benedictines. Benedict ..."was renowned for handing on to his monks a balanced way of life – particularly with respect to contemplative prayer and active work, "ora et labora". He recognized the danger of letting one dominate, and the benefit of having both side-by-side."
St. Benedict's Rule prescribes periods of work for the monks for "Idleness is the enemy of the soul" (RB 48.1).  Benedict viewed prayer and work as partners, and believed in combining contemplation with action.  

Some orders applied the concept directly to farm work and became an element in the movement towards land reclamation from rot and agricultural development in Western Europe. Other orders such as the Humiliati applied the concept to the production of woolen cloth using wheels in the period prior to the Industrial Revolution.

Present day examples
The phrase expresses the need to balance prayer and work in monastic settings and has been used in many religious communities from the Middle Ages onwards.

In addition to praying the Liturgy of the Hours, the Benedictine monks of St. Andrew Abbey teach at Benedictine High School and staff a retreat house. Ora et Labora is a publication of Benedictine High School and St. Andrew Abbey.

While the monastic life of the monks of Our Lady of Dallas Cistercian Abbey is centered upon the liturgy, their primary occupation is teaching. They find this "a successful symbiosis of Cistercian life and apostolic mission".

The Anglican sisters of the Community of St. Mary in Greenwich, New York pray the Divine Office five times each day and raise Cashmere goats for wool.

Uses
An alternative rendering of the phrase, laborare est orare (literally "To work is to pray"), features prominently in Thomas Carlyle's Past and Present (1843): "Admirable was that of the old Monks, 'Laborare est Orare, Work is Worship.'"

In 1818, Dalhousie University was established in Nova Scotia, adopting the motto of Ora et Labora in 1870.  This is also the motto of Clan Ramsay, of which the Earl of Dalhousie is the leader.

In 1874, Wesley College, Colombo, a high school in Sri Lanka, was founded by Methodist missionaries. It has been using "Ora Et Labora" as the motto since its inception.

Ora et labora is the motto of Melbourne Grammar School in Australia and the current motto of St. Joseph's Institution, an independent school in Singapore.

It is also carved into the entry of The King's School Chapel, Parramatta, Australia.

It is also the motto of Infant Jesus Anglo Indian High School (IJHS), Tangasseri, Kollam, Kerala, India, the motto of the Chapel of St Olav in Sandefjord in Norway and the motto of the St. Michael's Secondary School in Penampang, Sabah, Malaysia.

See also

 Critique of work
 Lectio Divina
 Prayer, meditation and contemplation in Christianity
 Work ethic

Notes

Bibliography
 Ora et labora: prayer and action as cooperation with God by Robert Field, University of the South, 1993

External link

Christian terminology